Elgin is a historic plantation house located near Warrenton, Warren County, North Carolina.  It was built about 1835, and is a two-story, three bay, Federal style temple-form frame dwelling.  It has a gable roof, pedimented front porch, and flanking porches. At the rear is an earlier -story frame dwelling with a gable roof. The front facade features a Palladian entrance with sidelights and Tuscan colonnettes. The house is similar in style to Dalkeith.

It was listed on the National Register of Historic Places in 1973.

References

External links

https://brucejohnsonstudios.com/uncategorized/architectural-photography-and-virtual-tours-of-the-elgin-plantation-in-warrenton-north-carolina-by-bruce-johnson-studios/, 15 pictures and a full immersive 360 degree Virtual Tour

Plantation houses in North Carolina
Historic American Buildings Survey in North Carolina
Houses on the National Register of Historic Places in North Carolina
Federal architecture in North Carolina
Houses completed in 1830
Houses in Warren County, North Carolina
National Register of Historic Places in Warren County, North Carolina